Snetkov is a Russian surname. Notable people with the surname include:

 Boris Snetkov (1925–2006), Soviet general
 Nikolai Snetkov (1935–2005), Soviet ice hockey player for HK Lokomotiv Moscow and KGB officer

Russian-language surnames